McBirney is a surname. Notable people with the surname include:

James H. McBirney (1870–1944), American banker
Martin McBirney (1922–1974), Northern Irish judge and politician
Nettie McBirney (1887–1982), American inventor and writer
Sam P. McBirney (c. 1877 – 1936), American football coach and banker